Gymnostomum calcareum is a species of moss belonging to the family Pottiaceae.

It has cosmopolitan distribution.

References

Pottiaceae